Shahnawaz Alam (born 10 September 1982) is an Indian politician. He is a Cabinet Minister in Bihar government with Disaster Management portfolio since 16 August 2022. He is an MLA representing Jokihat assembly constituency of Bihar Legislative Assembly since May 2018.

Party switch from AIMIM to RJD 
He along with three other AIMIM MLAs viz., Anzar Nayeemi, Syed Ruknuddin Ahmed and Izhar Asfi joined RJD on 29 June 2022 in the presence of RJD chief Lalu Prasad Yadav leaving Amour MLA and Bihar AIMIM chief Akhtarul Iman as lone AIMIM MLA in the Legislative Assembly. After these four MLAs joined the RJD, party became the largest force in the Assembly with 80 members surpassing Bhartiya Janata Party (BJP).

AIMIM party leaders have blamed Shahnawaz Alam for breaking the party and luring MLAs into the RJD but Shahnawaz Alam denied the allegations in an interview with Main Media.

Family and personal life 
He is the youngest son of former Indian politician and Minister of State Home in Union government Taslimuddin. Late Taslimuddin had represented Kishanganj, Araria and Purnia Lok Sabha of Seemanchal and Jokihat as an MLA. Shahnawaz is the brother of former Member of Parliament from Araria and Jokihat MLA Sarfaraz Alam. He lives with his mother, wife and kids at his paternal house in Sisauna village under Jokihat Block.

Political career 
He comes from the flood-prone Seemanchal area of Bihar, where flood destruction is a major issue. The local population has high hopes for him as a Disaster Management minister to work for the upliftment of the marginalised communities of the area.

He was a Member of Legislative Assembly from Bihar for a short period from May 2018 to November 2020 as a Rashtriya Janata Dal MLA from Jokihat but when Rashtriya Janata Dal denied him ticket in 2020 Bihar Assembly Election, he joined All India Majlis-E-Ittehadul Muslimeen (AIMIM) of Hyderabad MP Asaduddin Owaisi.

He contested the election against his brother and ex Jokihat MLA Sarfaraz Alam who was contesting on RJD ticket and won the election for second time with big margin as an AIMIM candidate. He rejoined the Rashtriya Janata Dal (RJD) party in 2022.

Work 
Shahnawaz Alam is involved in his constituency in building local infrastructure to provide better connectivity for villagers. People have huge expectations from him for Mahananada basin plan. He himself belongs to same area where Koshi river is appearing as a disaster due to lack of bands and proper management. As he left AIMIM people somehow lost faith in him. After winning in 2020, he has laid foundation stone of many roads and bridges in his constituency. He is being loved by locals for being accessible to everyone on short notice.

References 

Bihar MLAs 2020–2025
All India Majlis-e-Ittehadul Muslimeen politicians